Wijewo  is a village in Leszno County, Greater Poland Voivodeship, in west-central Poland. It is the seat of the gmina (administrative district) called Gmina Wijewo.

The village has an approximate population of 1,200.

References

Independent information service for the municipality of Wijewo

Villages in Leszno County